Helicostylis is a genus of plants in the family Moraceae.

Species include:

Helicostylis affinis Miq. 
Helicostylis asperifolia Ducke 
Helicostylis duckei A.D.Hawkes 
Helicostylis elegans (J.F.Macbr.) C.C.Berg 
Helicostylis heterotricha Ducke
Helicostylis lancifolia Ducke 
Helicostylis latifolia Pittier 
Helicostylis montana Pittier 
Helicostylis obtusifolia Standl. ex Gleason 
Helicostylis pedunculata Benoist 
Helicostylis podogyne Ducke 
Helicostylis poeppigiana Trécul 
Helicostylis scabra (J.F.Macbr.) C.C.Berg 
Helicostylis tomentosa (Poepp. & Endl.) Rusby
Helicostylis tovarensis (Klotzsch & Karsten) C.C.Berg 
Helicostylis turbinata C.C.Berg 
Helicostylis urophylla Standl.

 
Moraceae genera
Taxonomy articles created by Polbot